Vinkovci is a city in Slavonia, in the Vukovar-Syrmia County in eastern Croatia. The city's registered population was 28,247 in the 2021 census, the total population of the city was 31,057, making it the largest town of the county. Surrounded by many large villages, it is a local transport hub, particularly because of its railways.

Name
The name  comes from the Croatian given name Vinko, cognate to the name Vincent. It has been in use following a dedication of the oldest town church of Saint Elijah to Saint Vincent the Deacon in the Middle Ages. The name of the city in Croatian is plural.

It was called  in antiquity. Cibale is a toponym derived from geomorphology, from Indo-European  meaning "ascension" or "head".

It is assumed that the root is in Proto-Indo-European  (head), in the sense of a hill, meaning a place that was protected from the flooding of Bosut.

History
The area around Vinkovci has been continually inhabited since the Neolithic period. 

The Sopot culture eponym site is Sopot, an archeological site near Vinkovci, which was dated to 5480–3790 BC.

Vučedol culture finds in Vinkovci, generally dated to 3000–2500 BC, include a piece of ceramics dated to 2600 BC with an astral calendar, the first one found in Europe that shows the year starting at the dusk of the first day of spring.

It was the birthplace of Roman emperors Valentinian I and Valens. The Roman thermal bath is still preserved underground, along with several other Roman buildings located near the center of today's Vinkovci. The 4th century Battle of Cibalae, between the armies of Constantine the Great and Licinius, was fought nearby.

In the Middle Ages, Vinkovci was one of the sites of the Bijelo Brdo culture. The City museum of Vinkovci maintains a survey of thirteen medieval archeological finds in Vinkovci and its surroundings, .

From 1526 to 1687 it was part of the Ottoman Empire, administratively located in Sirem  (whose seat was in ) within the Budin Eyalet. It was captured by the Habsburg Empire in 1687, which was later confirmed by the Treaty of Karlowitz in 1699. Until 1918, Vinkovci (named Winkowcze before 1850) was part of the Austrian monarchy (Kingdom of Croatia-Slavonia after the compromise of 1867), in the Slavonian Military Frontier, under the administration of the  until 1881.

In the late 19th and early 20th century, Vinkovci was a district capital in the Syrmia County of the Kingdom of Croatia-Slavonia. Zion, the first Zionist organisation in the area of modern-day Croatia was established in Vinkovci. From 1941 to 1945, Vinkovci was part of the Independent State of Croatia, whose authorities destroyed the Vinkovci Synagogue in 1941–42, which was among the largest and the most prestigious synagogues in Croatia. From 17 April 1944 the city was heavily bombed by the Allies due to its important position in transportation.

The city and its surroundings were gravely impacted by the 1991–95 Croatian War of Independence. The city was close to the front lines between the forces of Croatia and the rebel Serbs of SAO Eastern Slavonia, Baranja and Western Syrmia, but it managed to avoid the fate of nearby Vukovar, which was besieged in the infamous Battle of Vukovar. The eastern sections of the town were substantially damaged by shelling, and the nearby village of Cerić was almost completely destroyed. The most significant destruction in the town center were the town library, which burned down to the ground, the town court, the Catholic and Orthodox churches (the Church of Saints Eusebius and Polion and the Church of Pentecost, respectively), both of its hospitals, the town theatre, two cinemas, and a host of businesses and factories. The Church of Pentecost was dynamited by local Croatian forces as retaliation after rebel Serbs forces severely damaged the local Catholic rectory. In December 1995–96, the Vinkovci rail station served as a rail offloading base for the United States Army's 1st Armored Division en route to Županja to cross the Sava River into Bosnia during Operation Joint Endeavor.

The Croatian Army has stationed the headquarters of its Armored-Mechanized Guard Brigade at Vinkovci barracks. The current brigade was formed in 2007 and it incorporated two former guards brigades (3rd and 5th) as well as several other units formed in the 1990s during the war of independence.

Geography

The city lies in a flatland on the Bosut river, at an elevation of approx. , and has a mild continental climate. Vinkovci is also part of the smaller subregion of Syrmia.

It is connected to all main railroad routes in the region, while state roads D46 and D55 connect it to motorways; river Bosut is not a waterway. Nearby villages and adjacent municipalities include Ivankovo, Jarmina, Markušica, Nuštar, Privlaka and Stari Jankovci.

Demographics

The city administrative area includes the following settlements:
 Mirkovci, population 2,810
 Vinkovci, population 28,247

The local administration consists of the following local boards:
 Lenije
 Stjepan Radić
 Centar
 Kolodvor
 Dvanaest redarstvenika
 Vinkovačko Novo Selo
 Lapovci
 Ban Jelačić
 Zagrebački blok
 Slavija
 Mala Bosna
 Mirkovci

In 2011, it was the 17th largest city in Croatia.

By ethnic group, as of census 2011, the population of Vinkovci is:
 Croats, 92.35%
 Serbs, 4.87%
 Hungarians, 0.46%
 Others, 2.32%

Economy and transportation

Its economy is primarily based on trade, transport and food and metal processing. Industries include foodstuff, building material, wood and timber, metal-processing, leather and textile. Due to the surrounding farmland, also notable are farming and livestock breeding, and the town hosts a Crop Improvement Centre.

Vinkovci railway station is the main railway junction of eastern Croatia, of railroads leading from Bosnia and Herzegovina toward Hungary and from the capital Zagreb toward Belgrade. The large railway junction, after Zagreb the second largest in Croatia, underlies the importance of transit in Vinkovci.
Vinkovci is also the meeting point of the Posavina and Podravina roads and the intersection of the main road D55 Županja–Vinkovci–Vukovar and several regional roads.

Vinkovci, though it is spelled Vincovci in the book, and its rail station are featured in Agatha Christie's Murder on the Orient Express as the place near which the Orient Express breaks down.

Culture

The town features extremely rich cultural and historical heritage, the most interesting attraction being the pre-Romanesque church on Meraja from 1100, with the coats of arms of the kings Koloman and Ladislas, as one of the most important medieval cultural monuments in Croatia. The building has recently had the ancient timber beams removed and a new, modern, brick upper section and roof added.

The most famous annual event, one of the biggest in Slavonia, is the folk music festival "Vinkovci Autumns" (Vinkovačke Jeseni), which includes the folklore show and the presentation of folk customs of Slavonia. It is characterized by a number of original folk music performances, beautiful traditional costumes, a beauty contest, competitions of the manufacturers of kulen (smoked paprika-flavoured sausage), plum brandy and other traditional foodstuffs, and especially by the magnificent closing parade.

Vinkovci's music school Josip Runjanin is named after the composer of the Croatian national anthem  Lijepa naša domovino. The Vinkovci gymnasium is named after Matija Antun Reljković, a Slavonian writer who lived in the city in the 18th century.

Monuments and sights

 Vinkovačke jeseni

Notable natives and residents

 Goran Bare, rock singer (Majke, Hali Gali Halid)
 Vanja Drach, actor
 Mirko Filipović, Kickboxer and Mixed Martial-Arts fighter
 Satan Panonski, Yugoslav and Croatian musician and freak performer
 Mavro Frankfurter, last Vinkovci Rabbi
 Carl Heitzmann, pathologist and dermatologist
 Lavoslav Kadelburg, lawyer, judge, polyglot and activist
 Branko Karačić, footballer/manager
 Mario Kasun, basketballer
 Josip Kozarac, writer
 Ivan Kozarac, writer
 Dubravko Mataković, cartoonist
 Dina Merhav, Israeli sculptor
 Eugen Miskolczy, physician
 Otto Miskolczy, entrepreneur and World War II Partisan
 Josip Runjanin, composer of Croatian anthem
 Stjepan Šejić, comic-book author
 Rade Šerbedžija, actor
 Erich Šlomović, art collector
 Josip Šokčević, Croatian viceroy
 Theodoric the Great, ostrogothic ruler and king of Italy
 Valens, Roman Emperor
 Valentinian, Roman Emperor
 Ivan Bošnjak footballer
 Sava Šumanović, Serbian painter

International relations

Twin towns — sister cities

Vinkovci is twinned with:

Sport

A local football club still carries the Latin name for Vinkovci, Cibalia.

See also 
 Vinkovci Treasure

References

Bibliography

Notes

External links

 

 
Cities and towns in Croatia
Slavonia
Populated places in Syrmia
Populated places in Vukovar-Syrmia County
Syrmia County